The following is a list of notable deaths in March 2008.

Entries for each day are listed alphabetically by surname. A typical entry lists information in the following sequence:
 Name, age, country of citizenship at birth, subsequent country of citizenship (if applicable), reason for notability, cause of death (if known), and reference.

March 2008

1
Haroldo de Andrade, 73, Brazilian radio presenter (Rádio Globo), multiple organ dysfunction syndrome.
Dora Dolz, 66, Spanish-born Dutch artist.
Kevin Dunn, 57, British Bishop of Hexham and Newcastle.
Bhanbhagta Gurung, 86, Nepalese Gurkha soldier, recipient of the Victoria Cross.
Raúl Reyes, 59, Colombian FARC second-in-command, airstrike.
Moustafa Soheim, 70, Egyptian Olympic fencer.
Sid Spindler, 75, Polish-born Australian senator (Democrats) (1990–1996), liver cancer.
Andrey Tissin, 32, Russian world and European canoeing champion, Olympian and coach, drowning.
George Toley, 91, American collegiate tennis coach.

2
Sofiko Chiaureli, 70, Georgian actress.
Barbara Anne Davis, 77, American baseball player (AAGPBL)
Roger Gill, 35, Guyanese Olympic sprinter, car accident.
Jeff Healey, 41, Canadian jazz and blues-rock guitarist and vocalist, sarcoma.
Carl Hoddle, 40, English footballer (Leyton Orient, Barnet), brain aneurysm.
Paul Raymond, 82, British pornographic magazine publisher and property magnate.
Ted Robinson, 84, American golf course architect, pancreatic cancer.
Frederick Seitz, 96, American physicist who co-discovered the Wigner-Seitz cell.

3
Bertil Albertsson, 86, Swedish runner.
Vizol Angami, 93, Indian Naga politician.
Ramón Barquín, 93, Cuban army colonel and diplomat, opponent of Fulgencio Batista, led 1956 coup attempt, cancer.
William Brice, 86, American painter and UCLA professor, injuries from fall.
Giuseppe Di Stefano, 86, Italian operatic tenor, after long coma following assault.
Donald S. Lopez, Sr., 84, American deputy director of the National Air and Space Museum, heart attack.
Malcolm McKenna, 77, American paleontologist.
Norm O'Neill, 71, Australian cricketer, throat cancer.
Annemarie Renger, 88, German politician (SPD), Speaker of Parliament (1972–1976).
Iván Ríos, 45, Colombian FARC commander, shot by his Chief of Security.
Norman "Hurricane" Smith, 85, British singer, recording engineer (The Beatles, Pink Floyd) and record producer.
Kenneth Woollcombe, 84, British Bishop of Oxford (1971–1978).

4
Hossein Alikhani, 63, Iranian NGO founder, political scientist and author, leukemia.
Richard Davis Anderson, 86, American mathematician.
Erwin Ballabio, 89, Swiss football goalkeeper.
Robert Bruning, 79, Australian actor, heart attack.
Gary Gygax, 69, American game designer, co-creator of Dungeons & Dragons.
Tina Lagostena Bassi, 82, Italian politician.
Elena Nathanael, 61, Greek actress, lung cancer.
Leonard Rosenman, 83, American composer (Barry Lyndon, Star Trek IV: The Voyage Home), Oscar winner (1977, 1978), heart attack.
Semka Sokolović-Bertok, 72, Croatian actress, stroke.
George Walter, 79, Antiguan Premier (1971–1976), heart attack.

5
Eve Carson, 22, American student leader (UNC Chapel Hill), shot.
Derek Dooley, 78, British footballer and former chairman of Sheffield United.
Elfriede Kaun, 93, German 1936 Olympic bronze medalist in the high jump.
Nader Khalili, 72, Iranian architect, heart failure.
John C. Mackie, 87, American Representative from Michigan (1965–1967).
Richard Miles McCool, 86, American Medal of Honor recipient for actions during World War II.
Don McFarlane, 81, Canadian Olympic sprinter.
Stephen Oliver, 66, American actor (Peyton Place), gastric cancer.
Sixty Rayburn, 91, American politician.
Hajibey Sultanov, 86, Azerbaijani astronomer, fire accident.
Joseph Weizenbaum, 85, German-born American computer scientist, inventor of ELIZA computer program, stroke.
Ihor Yemchuk, 77, Ukrainian Olympic silver (1952) and bronze (1956) medal-winning rower.

6
Gloria Shayne Baker, 84, American songwriter (Rain Rain Go Away, Do You Hear What I Hear?), lung cancer.
Lili Boniche, 87, Algerian-born French singer of Andalusian Arabic songs.
Don Curtis, 80, American professional wrestler, stroke.
Kurt Eberling, Sr., 77, German-American inventor of SpaghettiOs, cancer.
Gustaw Holoubek, 84, Polish film and theatre actor and politician.
Stanislav Konopásek, 84, Czechoslovakian Olympic silver medallist in ice hockey (1948).
*Peter Poreku Dery, 89, Ghanaian cardinal, Archbishop of Tamale (1974–1994).
Kiddinan Sivanesan, 51, Sri Lankan Tamil Parliament member (TNA), roadside bomb.
Malvin Wald, 90, American screenwriter (The Naked City).

7
Ossie Álvarez, 74, American Major League Baseball player (Washington Senators, Detroit Tigers).
Luisa Isabel Álvarez de Toledo, 71, Spanish noblewoman and author.
Isaías Carrasco, 43, Spanish Basque politician, shot.
Leonardo Costagliola, 87, Italian football goalkeeper (ACF Fiorentina).
Dick Durrell, 82, American founding publisher of People magazine, lung cancer.
David Gale, 86, American mathematician, heart attack.
Charles A. Gillespie, Jr., 72, American diplomat, Ambassador to Colombia and Chile, cancer.
Leon Greenman, 97, British Holocaust survivor, only Englishman sent to Auschwitz.
Julius Paltiel, 83, Norwegian Holocaust survivor.
Francis Pym, 86, British Conservative Party politician, Foreign Secretary (1982–1983).
Howard Wing, 92, Chinese Olympic cyclist.

8
Lucy G. Acosta, 81, Mexican-American activist.
Sadun Aren, 85, Turkish academic and politician.
Carol Barnes, 63, British ITN news presenter, stroke.
Donald C. MacDonald, 94, Canadian politician, former leader of the Ontario New Democratic Party.
Les Smith, 80, English footballer (Wolves, Aston Villa), cancer.

9
Gus Giordano, 84, American Emmy Award-winning jazz dancer, pneumonia.
Edward L. Hart, American poet and Mormon hymnwriter.
Florent Jodoin, 85, Canadian Olympic cyclist.
Simon Reisman, 88, Canadian chief negotiator of the Canada-United States Free Trade Agreement, cardiac arrest.

10
Galo Ador Jr., 39, Filipino cartoonist.
Richard Biegenwald, 67, American serial killer.
William Bradford, 61, American serial killer, natural causes.
Hugh Brown, 88, British Labour politician, Parliamentary Under-Secretary of State for Scotland (1974–1979).
Charles Wayne Day, 65, American blues guitarist, wrote the distinctive riff in "Secret Agent Man".
Robert P. Foster, 90, American academic administrator, president of Northwest Missouri State University (1964–1977).
Ricardo García, 81, Mexican Olympic cyclist.
Dennis Irwin, 56, American jazz double bassist, complications of cancer.
Ana Kalandadze, 83, Georgian poet.
Vangelis Kazan, 70, Greek actor.
Lee Ho-seong, 41, South Korean baseball player, thief and murderer, suicide by drowning.
Radovan Lukavský, 88, Czech actor.
Sai Htee Saing, 57, Burmese singer.
Otto Schnellbacher, 84, American football and basketball player, cancer.

11
J. I. Albrecht, 77, American-born Canadian manager and director in the Canadian Football League, complications from a stroke.
Zakaria Deros, 62, Malaysian former politician, heart attack.
John Roderick, 93, American journalist (AP) and author, extensively covered China (1930s–2000s), heart failure and pneumonia.
Phyllis Spira, 64, South African prima ballerina, complications of surgery.
Dave Stevens, 52, American illustrator, creator of The Rocketeer, leukemia.
Michael J. Todd, 50, British Chief Constable of Greater Manchester Police, exposure.
Lukas Vischer, 81, Swiss theologian.

12
Alan Buckley, 66, British rugby union and rugby league player.
Folke Eriksson, 82, Swedish Olympic water polo player.
Erwin Geschonneck, 101, German actor.
Jorge Guinzburg, 59, Argentine journalist and comedian, pulmonary infection.
Alun Hoddinott, 78, Welsh composer.
Cassià Maria Just, 81, Spanish cleric, former abbot of Santa Maria de Montserrat, stroke.
Howard Metzenbaum, 90, American politician, Senator from Ohio (1974, 1976–1995).
Ovidiu Iuliu Moldovan, 66, Romanian actor, cancer.
Károly Németh, 85, Hungarian politician.
Lazare Ponticelli, 110, Italian-born last official French veteran of World War I.
Asesela Ravuvu, 77, Fijian politician and former University of the South Pacific academic, natural causes.
Tom Tuohy, 90, British chemist, averted potential disaster at Windscale.

13
Tessa Birnie, 73, New Zealand concert pianist.
Bill Bolick, 90, American country music performer (The Blue Sky Boys).
Iosif Boyarsky, 90, Russian former Soyuzmultfilm director, one of the fathers of Soviet animation.
Claire Brooks, 76, British politician.
Martin Fierro, 66, American saxophonist, cancer.
Scarlet Garcia, 23, Filipino model, shot.
Terry Moloney, 68, Irish hurler.
Chike Obi, 86, Nigerian mathematician and politician.
Rafael Tufiño, 85, Puerto Rican painter and printmaker, lung cancer.

14
Taslim Arif, 53, Pakistani cricketer, lung infection.
Gary Binfield, 42, British swimmer, heart attack.
Mel Brandt, 88, American actor and announcer.
Clyde Cameron, 95, Australian politician, MP (1949–1980), Minister in the Whitlam Government.
Mike Dawson, 54, American football player, heart attack.
Stig-Olof Grenner, 68, Finnish Olympic swimmer
Chiara Lubich, 88, Italian Catholic activist, founder of the Focolare Movement.
Ingvald Ulveseth, 83, Norwegian politician.

15
Sambhaji Angre, 87, Indian politician.
Jacob DeShazer, 95, American bombardier, participant in the Doolittle Raid.
Mikey Dread, 54, Jamaican singer, record producer and broadcaster, brain tumor.
Vytautas Kernagis, 56, Lithuanian singer, television announcer, gastric cancer.
G. David Low, 52, American astronaut, colon cancer.
Benjamin Ngoubou, 83/84, Gabonese foreign minister.
Sam C. Pointer, Jr., 73, American federal judge for the District Court for the Northern District of Alabama (1970–2000).
Ken Reardon, 86, Canadian ice hockey defenceman (Montreal Canadiens), Alzheimer's disease.
Ross Scaife, 47, American classicist and digital humanist, cancer.
Yury Tsuranov, 72, Soviet Olympic sport shooter.
Vicki Van Meter, 26, American pilot, suicide by gunshot.

16
Anura Bandaranaike, 59, Sri Lankan politician, complications from cancer.
Bill Brown, 95, Australian cricket captain, member of 1948 Invincibles team.
Ola Brunkert, 61, Swedish session drummer for ABBA, injuries from accidental fall.
Wayne Davis, 44, American football player, motor neurone disease.
Ivan Dixon, 76, American actor and director (Hogan's Heroes), hemorrhage.
Gary Hart, 66, American professional wrestling manager, heart attack.
John Hewer, 86, British actor (Captain Birdseye), natural causes.
Otto Jemelka, 93/94, Czechoslovakian Olympic modern pentathlete.
Daniel MacMaster, 39, Canadian rock vocalist (Bonham), group A streptococcal infection.
Mary Meader, 91, American aerial photographer.
Bob Purkey, 78, American baseball player (Cincinnati Reds, Pittsburgh Pirates), Alzheimer's disease.
John Shedd Reed, 90, American president of the Atchison, Topeka and Santa Fe Railway (1967–1986), natural causes.
Laurus Škurla, 80, Czechoslovakian-born American first hierarch of the ROCOR.
Jonathan Williams, 79, American poet, photographer and publisher, founder of The Jargon Society.

17
Roland Arnall, 68, American owner of Ameriquest Mortgage, Ambassador to the Netherlands (2006–2008), cancer.
Claude Farell, 93, Austrian actress.
Claus Luthe, 75, German automobile designer.
Georges Pisani, 89, French Olympic sailor

18
Hazel Barnes, 92, American philosopher.
Andrew Britton, 27, British-born spy novelist, undiagnosed heart condition.
Mariano Di Gangi, 84, Canadian Presbyterian minister.
Philip Jones Griffiths, 72, British photojournalist, cancer.
Martin Halliday, 81, British physician.
Jyrki Hämäläinen, 65, Finnish journalist, editor of Suosikki magazine.
Anthony Minghella, 54, British director (The English Patient, Cold Mountain, The Talented Mr. Ripley), Oscar winner (1997), post-surgery haemorrhage.
Geoffrey Pearson, 80, Canadian diplomat, son of former Prime Minister Lester B. Pearson.
Anton Pongratz, 60, Romanian Olympic fencer.
Maral Rahmanzadeh, 92, Azeri painter, visual artist.
Oreste Rizzini, 67, Italian voice actor, stomach cancer.
Justin Wright, 27, American animator (WALL-E).

19
Joe Blackledge, 79, British cricketer, former captain and president of the Lancashire County Cricket Club.
Sir Arthur C. Clarke, 90, British science fiction author (2001: A Space Odyssey), heart failure.
Hugo Claus, 78, Belgian author, voluntary euthanasia.
John Dowie, 93, Australian sculptor, stroke.
Mia Permanto, 19, Finnish singer, finalist in Idols, accidental drug overdose.
Raghuvaran, 59, Indian actor, cardiac arrest.
Paul Scofield, 86, British actor (A Man for All Seasons, Quiz Show, Serpico), Oscar winner (1967), leukaemia.
Chantal Sébire, 53, French esthesioneuroblastoma patient and euthanasia activist, Pentobarbital overdose

20
Eric Ashton, 73, British rugby league player for Wigan and Great Britain, cancer.
Sobhan Babu, 71, Indian actor, cardiac arrest.
Ann Baumgartner, 89, American aviator.
Alexandru Custov, 53, Romanian footballer.
Prince Ferdinand, Duke of Castro, 81, Italian claimant to headship of the House of Bourbon-Two Sicilies.
Jon Hassler, 74, American author, progressive supranuclear palsy.
Al Hofmann, 60, American drag racer, heart attack.
Carlos Galvão de Melo, 86, Portuguese general, Conservative member of National Salvation Junta.
Bestia Salvaje, 46, Mexican lucha libre wrestler, liver disease.
Abigail Taylor, 6, American girl whose severe swimming pool injury led to tougher laws.
Brian Wilde, 80, British comedic actor (Porridge, Last of the Summer Wine).

21
Gadzhi Abashilov, 58, Russian journalist, chief of VGTRK TV company in Dagestan, shot.
Anna Alchuk, 52, Russian poet and visual artist, suicide.
Henri Blaffart, 42, Belgian wildlife conservationist for Conservation International in New Caledonia, drowned.
Tamás Bujkó, 48, Hungarian judo competitor, stabbed and beaten.
Denis Cosgrove, 59, British geographer and Alexander von Humboldt professor of geography at UCLA, cancer.
Klaus Dinger, 61, German drummer (Neu!, Kraftwerk), heart failure.
Roy Foster, 62, American baseball player (Cleveland Indians).
John Fowler, 42, American drummer (Steelheart), brain aneurysm.
Lynne Golding-Kirk, 87, Australian ballerina, complications of surgery.
George Gross, 85, Canadian sports journalist, founding sports editor of the Toronto Sun, heart attack.
Shusha Guppy, 72, Iranian writer and singer.
Raymond Leblanc, 92, Belgian comic book producer and publisher (The Adventures of Tintin).
John List, 82, American mass murderer, complications of pneumonia.
*Gabriel París Gordillo, 98, Colombian military governor, chairman of Colombian Military Junta.
Waltrude Schleyer, 92, German widow of Hanns-Martin Schleyer, advocate against the Red Army Faction.
Ilyas Shurpayev, 32, Russian journalist responsible for North Caucasus news on Channel One, murder by strangulation.
Merv Wallace, 91, New Zealand cricket captain (1952–1953).

22
Robert Dyk, 71, American television reporter (ABC News, WMTW-TV), cancer.
Cachao, 89, Cuban musician credited with creating mambo, renal failure.
Robert J. McIntosh, 85, American politician, U.S. Representative from Michigan (1957–1959).
Harvey Picker, 92, American philanthropist.
Adolfo Suárez Rivera, 81, Mexican cardinal, Archbishop Emeritus of Monterrey, brain hemorrhage.

23
Abdallah al-Ajmi, 29, Kuwaiti bomber, suicide.
Big Jack Armstrong, 62, American radio DJ.
Heath Benedict, 24, American football offensive lineman (Newberry College), 2008 NFL Draft prospect, hypertrophic cardiomyopathy.
Al Copeland, 64, American restaurateur, founder of Popeyes Chicken, salivary gland cancer.
Hugo Correa, 81, Chilean journalist and science fiction writer.
Maryam Farman Farmaian, 94, Iranian feminist activist.
E. A. Markham, 68, Montserrat-born British poet and writer.
George Switzer, 92, American mineralogist, acquired the Hope Diamond for the Smithsonian Institution, pneumonia.
Chase Tatum, 34, American World Championship Wrestling wrestler and road manager for Outkast, apparent accidental drug overdose.
Vaino Vahing, 68, Estonian writer and psychiatrist.

24
Severin Cecile Abega, 52, Cameroonian author and anthropologist.
Chalmers Alford, 53, American jazz guitarist, diabetes.
Neil Aspinall, 66, British road manager for The Beatles and executive of Apple Corps, lung cancer.
Rafael Azcona, 81, Spanish screenwriter, lung cancer.
Victor Christ-Janer, 92, American architect.
John Cushley, 65, Scottish footballer (Celtic, West Ham United), motor neurone disease.
Ray Drinkwater, 76, British footballer (Queens Park Rangers).
Boris Dvornik, 68, Croatian actor, stroke.
Mary Joan Nielubowicz, 79, American head of the Navy Nurse Corps (1983–1987).
Hal Riney, 75, American advertising executive, founder of Publicis & Hal Riney, cancer.
Dina Sassoli, 87, Italian actress.
Steven Sueppel, 42, American vice-president of Hills Bank and Trust Company, thief and murderer, suicide by car crash.
Sam Toy, 84, British chair of Ford UK (1980–1986).
Richard Widmark, 93, American actor (Kiss of Death, Judgment at Nuremberg, Against All Odds).
Sherri Wood, 28, Canadian journalist (Toronto Sun), brain cancer.

25
Art Aragon, 80, American boxer, stroke.
Ben Carnevale, 92, American college basketball coach.
Tony Church, 77, British actor.
Jimmy Dell, 83, British Wing Commander and test pilot.
Ronald Dick, 76, British Royal Air Force officer.
Thierry Gilardi, 49, French journalist and TF1 sports commentator, heart attack.
William G. Hyland, 79, American intelligence official.
Sergey Kramarenko, 61, Russian football player.
Abby Mann, 80, American screenwriter (Judgment at Nuremberg), Oscar winner (1962), heart failure.
Herb Peterson, 89, American fast food pioneer, inventor of the McDonald's Egg McMuffin.
Gene Puerling, 78, American vocal jazz musician, singer, musical arranger for the Hi-Los and Singers Unlimited.
Edward Rafeedie, 79, American senior judge for the California Central District Court, cancer.
Sérgio de Souza, 73, Brazilian journalist, co-founder and editor of Caros Amigos magazine, respiratory illness.
Ivan Toms, 55, South African physician, activist against apartheid and conscription, meningitis.

26
Hawley Ades, 99, American choral arranger.
Christian Bergelin, 62, French politician.
Robert Fagles, 74, American professor, poet and translator of ancient epics, prostate cancer.
Donald Hunter, 81, British football player.
Manuel Marulanda, 78, Colombian founder and commander-in-chief of terrorist organization FARC.
Wally Phillips, 82, American radio personality, pioneer of talk radio, Alzheimer's disease.

27
Jean-Marie Balestre, 86, French former President of FISA and later FIA.
Beverly Broadman, 60, American broadcaster with CNN and CBS News, cancer.
Billy Consolo, 73, American baseball player and coach, heart attack.
George Pruteanu, 60, Romanian literary critic and senator, heart attack.

28
Mohammad Asaduzzaman, 60, Bangladeshi university academic and administrator, cardiac arrest.
Lorne Ferguson, 77, Canadian ice hockey player.
Kunio Lemari, 65, Marshall Islands acting President (1996–1997).
Michael Podro, 77, British art historian.
Herb Rich, 79, American football player.
Ron Slinker, 62, American professional wrestler.
Helen Yglesias, 92, American novelist.

29
Fereydun Adamiyat, 87, Iranian historian.
Albert Alcalay, 90, American abstract artist.
Angus Fairhurst, 41, British artist, suicide by hanging.
Allan Ganley, 77, British jazz drummer.
Josef Mikl, 78, Austrian painter, cancer.
Isabella Nardoni, 5, Brazilian murder victim, thrown out of window.
Ralph Rapson, 93, American architect, heart attack.
Albert Stallard, Baron Stallard, 86, British Labour MP and life peer.
Myint Thein, 62, Burmese National League for Democracy spokesman, stomach cancer.

30
Marie-Françoise Audollent, 70, French actress, accidental fall.
Anders Göthberg, 32, Swedish guitarist (Broder Daniel).
Douglas Kent Hall, 69, American writer and photographer.
David Leslie, 54, British racing driver and commentator, Farnborough air crash.
Sean Levert, 39, American R&B singer.
Richard Lloyd, 63, British racing driver and team owner, Farnborough air crash.
Jim Mooney, 88, American comic book artist (Batman, Spider-Man).
David D. Newsom, 90, American Ambassador to the Philippines (1977–1978), respiratory failure.
Dith Pran, 65, Cambodian-born American journalist, survivor of the Killing Fields, pancreatic cancer.

31
Nikolai Baibakov, 97, Russian economist, Gosplan head (1955–1957, 1965–1985), pneumonia.
Jules Dassin, 96, American film director (The Naked City, Rififi, Never on Sunday), influenza.
William Louis Dickinson, 82, American judge and Representative from Alabama (1965–1993), colon cancer.
Eliyahu Boruch Finkel, 60, Israeli rabbi and lecturer.
Robert F. Goheen, 88, American President of Princeton University (1957–1972), Ambassador to India (1977–1980), heart failure.
Bill Keightley, 81, American equipment manager for Kentucky Wildcats men's basketball since 1962, bleeding from spinal tumor.
Halszka Osmólska, 77, Polish palaeontologist.
David Todd, 93, American architect, designed Manhattan Plaza, former chairman of NYC Landmarks Preservation Commission.

References

2008-03
 03